Metallibure (brand names Aimax, Suisynchron, Turisynchron; former developmental code names ICI-33828, AY-61122, NSC-69536), also known as methallibure or methallibur (German), is a medication which was introduced in 1973 and has been used in veterinary medicine to synchronize estrus. It was withdrawn in the United States and Europe due to teratogenicity and has been replaced with altrenogest (Regumate, Matrix), a progestin.

The precise mechanism of action of metallibure is unknown. It has been described as a "nonsteroidal antigonadotropin" and it appears to act directly on the pituitary gland and/or hypothalamus to suppress gonadotropin secretion. However, metallibure has also been reported to be an antiprogestogen and to act specifically via inhibition of the biosynthesis or secretion of progesterone.

Metallibure has similar endocrinological effects in women. It is associated with several unpleasant side effects including appetite loss, nausea, occasional vomiting, lethargy, and drowsiness. Animal toxicity studies revealed that the medication induced the development of cataracts, and this resulted in the termination of its clinical development.

See also
 Bifluranol
 Paroxypropione
 Quadrosilan

References

Abandoned drugs
Antigonadotropins
Drugs with unknown mechanisms of action
Steroidogenesis inhibitors
Withdrawn drugs